Glyptosaurinae is an extinct subfamily of anguid lizards that lived in the Northern Hemisphere during the Late Cretaceous and the Paleogene.

Description

Glyptosaurines are known primarily from their osteoderms, scale-like pieces of bone that are embedded in the skin and cover much of their bodies. The shape and extent of the osteoderms in glyptosaurines are similar to those seen in an unrelated group of lizards called Monstersauria, which includes the living Gila monster and beaded lizard. The osteoderms of glyptosaurines are unusually complex, consisting of four distinct layers of bony tissue. These tissues may have derived from both the dermis (the lower layer of the skin) and the epidermis (the outer layer of the skin) during their development in the embryo. The tissue forming the outermost layer of glyptosaurine osteoderms is similar to tooth enamel and has even been given its own name, osteodermine.

Glyptosaurines have been split into the subgroups Melanosaurini and Glyptosaurini, although recent phylogenetic analyses show that Melanosaurini in its traditional sense is paraphyletic, representing an evolutionary grade of glytosaurines more basal ("primitive") than Glyptosaurini. Below is a cladogram from Conrad and Norell (2008) showing the interrelationships of glyptosaurines and their relationship to other anguid lizards:

Evolutionary history 
The earliest known Glyptosaurines like Odaxosaurus are known from the Late Cretaceous (Campanian) of North America. They arrived in Europe at the beginning of the Eocene (Ypresian). Only a single species, Stenoplacosaurus mongoliensis dating to the Mid-Eocene, is known from Asia. Glyptosaurines declined after the Mid-Eocene, become extinct in Europe by the end of the period as part of the "Grande Coupure". The youngest known remains of glyptosaurines is Peltosaurus granulosus from the Monroe Creek and upper Sharps formations of Sharps Corner, South Dakota, dating to the mid Oligocene, between 27.4 and 26.4 million years ago.

References

Anguids
Late Cretaceous first appearances
Cretaceous lizards
Paleocene lepidosaurs
Eocene lizards
Oligocene lepidosaurs
Paleogene extinctions
Prehistoric reptiles of Asia
Prehistoric reptiles of Europe
Prehistoric reptiles of North America
Fossil taxa described in 1872